Ana Luisa Carvajal Gamoneda (born 9 March 1962) is a Cuban chess player who holds the FIDE title of Woman International Master (WIM).

Biography
In 1978, she won the second place in FIDE Zonal Tournament (the first place won her compatriot Asela de Armas Pérez) and was awarded the FIDE Woman International Master (WIM) title. In 1979, Ana Luisa Carvajal Gamoneda participated at Interzonal Tournament in Rio de Janeiro and ranked 17th place.

References

External links
 
 

1962 births
Living people
Cuban female chess players
Chess Woman International Masters